The GCR Class 9Q, classified B7 by the LNER, was a class of 4-6-0 mixed traffic locomotives designed by John G. Robinson for fast goods, relief passenger and excursion services on the Great Central Railway.  They were a smaller wheeled version of Robinson's earlier Class 9P "Lord Faringdon" express passenger class (LNER Class B3).

History

GCR locomotives
The GCR built two batches at Gorton locomotive works, during 1921 and 1922, and they also ordered batches from Vulcan Foundry and the Beyer, Peacock and Company. Twenty eight locomotives had been delivered by Grouping in 1923. The GCR found that they were rather heavy on coal - this led to their nickname of "Black Pigs" - although not much worse than other 4 cylinder designs of the time. They were also remarkably quick to say that they had only 5ft 8in wheels and often pulled heavy expresses in the early period of their career.

LNER locomotives
The London and North Eastern Railway (LNER) ordered a fifth  batch of ten locomotives from Gorton works and these were delivered between August 1923 and March 1924.

Sub-classes
The last batch had reduced boiler mountings and detail differences to the cab to conform to the new LNER loading gauge. These were classified B7/2.  The earlier batches were classified B7/1.

Thirty-eight locomotives passed to British Railways in 1948, but withdrawal began soon afterwards. Some locomotives surviving in 1949 were renumbered between 61702 and 61713 to make more room for Thompson Class B1 locomotives then under construction.

Preservation
None have been preserved.

Numbering

References

09Q
4-6-0 locomotives
2′C h4 locomotives
Beyer, Peacock locomotives
Vulcan Foundry locomotives
Railway locomotives introduced in 1921
Scrapped locomotives
Standard gauge steam locomotives of Great Britain
 Great Central Railway 4-6-0s